Sunshine Island may refer to:
 Sunshine Island, Hong Kong
 nickname for Usedom, a Baltic Sea island in Pomerania, divided between Germany and Poland